Høgni Mohr (born in Tórshavn 8 October 1968) is a Faroese author and journalist. His book Fractura Nasi was the best selling book in 2017 throughout the Faroe Islands.  Fractura Nasi was translated into Danish 2019 by Kirsten Brix and published by Amanda Books. Danish title: Rejse for livet. The novel was sold to movie production in 2018.

Career 

Mohr has worked for newspapers in the Faroes and has been published in Danish and Icelandic national newspapers. He spent several years working as a radio and TV reporter with Faroese national broadcaster Kringvarp Føroya. He has also worked for the BBC and Al Jazeera and has hosted nature programmes for Vice Media, as well as being a correspondent to the Huffington Post.

His literary works are published in Faroese and Danish.

Bibliography 

  OCLC 475920953
  OCLC 762372543. Documentary book about the lifelong journey from birth to death at the national hospital in the Faroe Islands.
  OCLC 1012884471 A narrative and poetic non-fiction road trip story. Faroe Islands best selling book in 2017. Danish translation: Rejse for livet (2019).
  With illustrations by Astrid Andreasen.
Mohr, Høgni (2019). mær dámar ikki høgna hoydal (in Faroese). Øgiliga egið forlag. .
Mohr, Høgni (2020). Tað tómliga tolsemið (in Faroese). Øgiliga egið forlag. 
Mohr, Høgni (2021). Grøðandi greinir (in Faroese). Øgiliga egið forlag. ISBN 9789991880563
Mohr, Høgni (2022). Saga JAM (in Faroese). Øgiliga egið forlag. ISBN 9789991880570

Awards, nominations etc. 

 2012 – 6-months grant from the Mentanargrunnur Landsins (Faroese Cultural Fund)
 2014 – Nominated for the Faroese national short film award Geytin for the short film, "Fall for Ewe". 
 2019 – 6-months grant from the Mentanargrunnur Landsins (Faroese Cultural Fund)
 2019 – 6-months grant from the Mentanargrunnur Landsins (Faroese Cultural Fund)
 2019 – Art grant from the Åland Cultural Committee for a art stay at the historic Eckerö_Mail_and_Customs_House

References 

1968 births
Living people
Faroese writers